Brentton Muhammad (born 11 September 1990) is a professional footballer who plays as a goalkeeper for Vestri. Born in England, he represents the Antigua and Barbuda national team internationally.

Club career
Muhammad played college football in the United States for Florida Tech Panthers and then South Florida Bulls
 before signing for VSI Tampa Bay FC.

On his return to England he played for Catholic United.

in April 2015 he went on trial at Icelandic second division club Ægir and was awarded a one-year contract.

He joined Greenbay Hoppers in October 2015 and was part of their title-winning team.

He returned to England, playing in 2016 for Hullbridge Sports.

In 2016 he joined Tindastóll in Iceland after almost signing for a Mexican club. In 2018 he joined Vestri.

International career
Muhammad was one of eight overseas based players who committed to represent the country in the summer of 2014 making his full international debut on 3 September 2014 in a match against Anguilla in the Caribbean Cup.

References

External links
 
 
 South Florida Bulls bio

1990 births
Living people
Footballers from Greater London
English sportspeople of Antigua and Barbuda descent
Black British sportspeople
Association football goalkeepers
English footballers
Antigua and Barbuda footballers
Antigua and Barbuda international footballers
2014 Caribbean Cup players
South Florida Bulls men's soccer players
VSI Tampa Bay FC (PDL) players
Knattspyrnufélagið Ægir players
Hoppers F.C. players
Hullbridge Sports F.C. players
Ungmennafélagið Tindastóll men's football players
Vestri (football club) players
USL League Two players
2. deild karla players
3. deild karla players
1. deild karla players
English expatriate footballers
Antigua and Barbuda expatriate footballers
Expatriate soccer players in the United States
English expatriate sportspeople in the United States
Expatriate footballers in Iceland
English expatriate sportspeople in Iceland